Trapos ("Rags") is the second Attaque 77 live album.

Overview 
This is the second live album from Attaque 77, released and recorded in 2001 at the Estadio Obras Sanitarias in Buenos Aires.

Track listing

"Perfección" [Perfection]
"Cambios" [Changes]
"Cuanta Cerveza" [A lot of beer]
"El Perro" [The dog]
"El Jorobadito" [The little hunchback]
"Nuestros años felices" [Our happy years]
"El cielo puede esperar" [Heaven can wait]
"Soy rebelde" [I'm a rebel]
"Chicos y Perros" [Kids and dogs]
"Cinco estrellas" [Five stars]
"Gil" [Jerk]
"Alza tu voz" [Raise your voice]
"Ángeles caídos" [Fallen angels]
"Soy de Attaque" [I'm from Attaque]
"Canción inútil" [Useless song]
"Consejos del abuelo" [Grandpa's advice]
"Tres pájaros negros" [Three black birds]
"Espadas y Serpientes" [Swords and snakes]
"Vacaciones permanentes" [Permanent vacation]
"Dame el fuego de tu amor" [Give me the fire of your love]
"Hacelo por mi" [Do it for me]
"No me arrepiento de este amor" [I don't regret this love]
"Numancia"

Credits
Ciro Pertusi - Lead vocals, rhythm guitar.
Mariano Martínez - Lead guitar, vocals.
Luciano Scaglione - Bass, backing vocals.
Leonardo De Cecco - Drums.

References

External links
Attaque 77's official webpage

Attaque 77 albums
2001 live albums
Spanish-language live albums
Live albums recorded in Buenos Aires